Cagliari Calcio had a successful return to Serie A, finishing in 12th place and reaching the semi finals of the Coppa Italia. This was much thanks to a trio of attacking players consisting of Mauro Esposito, David Suazo and Gianfranco Zola, with Esposito scoring 16 league goals, a personal record.

Squad

Goalkeepers
  Fanis Katergiannakis
  Alex Brunner
  Gennaro Iezzo

Defenders
  Francesco Bega
  Diego López
  Alessandro Agostini
  Simone Loria
  Roberto Maltagliati
  Francesco Pisano
  Rocco Sabato

Midfielders
  Alessandro Budel
  Nelson Abeijón
  Marcello Albino
  Massimo Brambilla
  Daniele Conti
  Massimo Gobbi
  Loris Del Nevo
  Edgar Álvarez
  Fabio Macellari
  Claudio Pani

Attackers
  Antonio Langella
  Gianfranco Zola
  David Suazo
  Mauro Esposito
  Rolando Bianchi
  Horacio Peralta

Pre-season and friendlies

Serie A

Matches

Top Scorers
  Mauro Esposito 16
  Gianfranco Zola 9 (2)
  David Suazo 7 (1)
  Antonio Langella 6

Results summary

Sources
RSSSF - Italy Championship 2004/05

Cagliari Calcio seasons
Cagliari